Air Chief Marshal Sir Philip Bennet Joubert de la Ferté,  (21 May 1887 – 21 January 1965) was a senior commander in the Royal Air Force during the 1930s and the Second World War.

Early life
Joubert de la Ferté was born in Darjeeling, India to Colonel Charles Henry Joubert de la Ferté and Eliza Jane née
Meville. He was of partial French descent, his paternal grandfather having emigrated to England in 1840. He was sent to England as a child where he attended Elstree School and later Harrow School.

RAF career
Joubert de la Ferté joined the British Army attending the Royal Military Academy Woolwich and gaining his commission in 1907. From 1907 to 1913 he served in the Royal Field Artillery, rising to the rank of lieutenant. In 1913 he attended the Central Flying School and went on to serve in the Royal Flying Corps. With the outbreak of the First World War in 1914, he joined the British Expeditionary Force flying one of the first two operational sorties of the war. In 1915 Joubert de la Ferté  was appointed Officer Commanding, No. 15 Squadron RFC. Later that year he took up command of No. 1 Squadron. As the war progressed, Joubert de la Ferté commanded No. 33 Squadron and then several different wings. On 1 April 1918 Joubert de la Ferté transferred to the Royal Air Force in the rank of lieutenant colonel and by the end of hostilities in 1918 he had command of the Royal Air Force in Italy.

During the inter-war years, Joubert de la Ferté occupied several staff and command posts, rising through the ranks. Notably, he was appointed Air Officer Commanding No. 23 Group in 1929, Commandant of the RAF Staff College, Andover, in 1930 and Air Officer Commanding No. 11 Group in July 1936 before becoming Air Officer Commanding-in-Chief Coastal Command in September 1936.

At the start of the Second World War, Joubert de la Ferté was Air Officer Commanding Air Forces in India.  On his return to Great Britain he occupied a number of senior staff appointments and returned to his former post as Air Officer Commanding-in-Chief Coastal Command.  It was there that he pioneered several innovations. These included Planned Flying and Maintenance and the introduction of a torpedo version of the Beaufighter. In February 1943 he became an Inspector-General of the RAF.

On 23 November 1943, Joubert de la Ferté was appointed as the Deputy Chief of Staff (Information and Civil Affairs) at the South East Asia Command. Two years later on 14 November 1945, Joubert de la Ferté retired from the RAF.

In 1915 he married Marjorie Denison: they had two daughters.

Bibliography
The following books by Joubert de la Ferté were published:
The Fated Sky: An Autobiography – Hutchinson (1952)
The Third Service – Thames and Hudson (1955)
Rocket – Hutchinson (1957)
Look at Aircraft – H Hamilton (1960)
Birds and Fishes - The Story of Coastal Command – Hutchinson (1960)
The Forgotten Ones: The Story of the Ground Crews –  Hutchinson (1961)
Fun and Games – Hutchinson (1964)

References

|-
 

|-
 

|-

|-

|-

|-

1887 births
1965 deaths
English people of French descent
British Army personnel of World War I
Companions of the Distinguished Service Order
Commanders of the Legion of Merit
Companions of the Order of St Michael and St George
Graduates of the Royal Military Academy, Woolwich
Knights Commander of the Order of the Bath
Knights Grand Cross of the Order of Orange-Nassau
Knights of the Order of Saints Maurice and Lazarus
People educated at Elstree School
People educated at Harrow School
Recipients of the War Cross for Military Valor
Royal Air Force air marshals of World War II
Royal Field Artillery officers
Royal Flying Corps officers
Military personnel of British India